Doug Phillips may refer to:

Doug Phillips (politician) (born 1946), Canadian businessman and politician
Doug Phillips (rugby) (1919–2000), Welsh rugby union footballer
Doug Phillips (speaker) (born 1965), American Christian speaker
Doug Phillips (American football) (born 1968), American football coach
Douglas Phillips (designer) (1922-1995), American stained glass designer